Maurizio Lotti (12 May 1940 – 22 December 2014) was an Italian politician.

Biography 
Lotti was born in Poggio Rusco on May 12, 1940. He went on to get a law degree and work for a few years before first entering politics.

Lotti first elected politics when he was elected mayor of his hometown with a coalition led from Italian Communist Party. In 1975 he was appointed president of the Province of Mantua, and in 1983, at the end of two terms, he was a Communist Party Senator for two legislatures, until 1992.

External links 

 Italian Senate Page

References 

1940 births
2014 deaths
Presidents of the Province of Mantua
Italian Communist Party politicians
Senators of Legislature IX of Italy
Senators of Legislature X of Italy